MidCoast Council is a local government area (LGA) located in the Mid North Coast region of New South Wales, Australia. The council was formed on 12 May 2016 through a merger of the Gloucester Shire, Great Lakes and City of Greater Taree councils.

It includes the Manning River and valley adjoining the Three Brothers mountains.

The Mayor of the MidCoast Council is Councillor Claire Pontin, who was elected on 12 January 2022.

Towns and localities
The following towns and localities are located within Mid–Coast Council:

Heritage listings
MidCoast Council has a number of heritage-listed sites, including:
 High Conservation Value Old Growth forest

Demographics 
The population for the predecessor councils was estimated in 2015 as:
 5,160 in Gloucester Shire
 36,720 in Great Lakes Council and
 49,095 in City of Greater Taree.

Council 
MidCoast Council is composed of eleven councillors elected proportionally in a single ward. All councillors were elected to a fixed three-year term of office on 4 December 2021. The positions of Mayor and Deputy Mayor are chosen by councillors.

The current Council, elected in 2021, in order of election, is:

References

External links 
 Mid-Coast Council website

 
2016 establishments in Australia
Local government areas of New South Wales